The Nahatlatch River is a tributary of the Fraser River in the Canadian province of British Columbia. It originates in the Lillooet Ranges of the Coast Mountains and empties into the Fraser River in the Fraser Canyon, north of Boston Bar.

Course
The Nahatlatch's River originates in the Lillooet Ranges. It flows southeast, the northeast, collecting tributaries such as Mehatl Creek, Tachewana Creek, and Squakum Creek. It flows through Nahatlatch Lake, Hannah Lake, and Frances Lake. After the lakes the Nahatlatch River flows generally east to join the Fraser River in the Fraser Canyon.

The Mehatl Creek watershed is within Mehatl Creek Provincial Park. The Nahatlatch Provincial Park and Protected Area encompasses the Nahatlatch River's valley from Mehall Creek to Nahatlatch, Hannah, and Frances Lakes.

See also
 List of tributaries of the Fraser River
 List of rivers of British Columbia

References

Fraser Canyon
Rivers of the Pacific Ranges
Tributaries of the Fraser River
Yale Division Yale Land District